Marco Festa (born 6 June 1992) is an Italian footballer who plays for Pordenone.

Career

Castellana
Festa started off his career at Serie D club Castellana in 2009. He spent 2 years with the club and racked up 63 appearances.

Mantova
On 1 July 2011, Festa was sold to Mantova for an undisclosed fee. He made 91 appearances for the club. After returning from loan, Festa spent 2 more years at the club.

Portogruaro (Loan)
On 31 January 2013, Festa was sent out on loan to Portogruaro. He spent half a season there and only made one appearance. That appearance came on 10 February 2013 in a 2-0 loss to San Marino Calcio.

Crotone
On 11 July 2015, Festa was sold to Serie B club Crotone for an undisclosed fee. In the season they were promoted to Serie A, he made no appearances. He made his top flight debut on 28 August 2016 in a 3-1 loss to Genoa.

Pordenone
On 14 July 2022 he signed a 2-years deal for Pordenone.

References

External links

1992 births
Living people
Italian footballers
Association football goalkeepers
Serie A players
Serie B players
Serie C players
Serie D players
Mantova 1911 players
Ascoli Calcio 1898 F.C. players
F.C. Crotone players
Pordenone Calcio players